Charles Gorham Getchell (August 14, 1920 – July 7, 1980) was an American professional basketball and American football player. He played one season in the Basketball Association of America (BAA) as a member of the Pittsburgh Ironmen. During the 1947 National Football League (NFL) season Getchell was a member of the Baltimore Colts. He attended Temple University.

BAA career statistics

Regular season

References 
 
 

1920 births
1980 deaths
American men's basketball players
Baltimore Colts (1947–1950) players
Basketball players from Pennsylvania
Centers (basketball)
People from Abington Township, Montgomery County, Pennsylvania
Pittsburgh Ironmen players
Players of American football from Pennsylvania
Temple Owls football players
Temple Owls men's basketball players